Tupolev TB-6 (internal designation ANT-26) was a proposal by the Tupolev Design Bureau in the 1930s for a super-heavy bomber.  Had it been built, it would have been the biggest-ever Soviet bomber and the largest aircraft by wingspan of its time, nine feet short of the 320 foot span of the Hughes H-4 Hercules, although the Scaled Composites Stratolaunch is now the biggest plane by wingspan.

Development

The resulting ANT-26 design was to have 12 Mikulin M-34FRN engines, eight on the leading edge of the wing and four in two tandem pairs above the wings. The tail empennage would have had three vertical stabilizers on the tailplane, the center vertical stabilizer taller than the others. An alternative TB-6 design featured a bomber aircraft with six Mikulin M-44 engines and a single rudder.

Given the sheer size of the TB-6, Tupolev decided to build a sub-scale aircraft to test the flight behavior of the TB-6. The subscale model flew in 1935, piloted by B.N. Koodrin. However, by the mid-1930s the trend in military aviation shifted towards smaller and faster aircraft and the TB-6 was cancelled, by which time the airframe was 75 percent complete and the entire aircraft 16 percent complete.

ANT-28

In parallel with design of the ANT-26, the Tupolev Design bureau envisaged a vastly scaled-up ANT-20 with the same dimensions as the ANT-26 under the internal designation ANT-28 It was intended as an airliner and cargo plane with a maximum payload of 15,000 kg and a range of 1,500 km, and the arrangement of the engines was the same as for the TB-6. Like the TB-6, the ANT-28 never progressed past the drawing board.

Specifications (TB-6 estimated)

References

Duffy, Paul and Andrei Kankdalov. (1996) Tupolev The Man and His aircraft. Warrendale, PA: Society of Automotive Engineers.

TB-6
Twelve-engined push-pull aircraft
Abandoned military aircraft projects of the Soviet Union